Glenn Haynes (born 5 September 1960) is a Brazilian sailor.

He participated at the 1984 Summer Olympics in Los Angeles, where he placed seventh in the multihull class, together with Lars Grael.

References

External links 
 

1960 births
Living people
Brazilian male sailors (sport)
Olympic sailors of Brazil
Sailors at the 1984 Summer Olympics – Tornado
Place of birth missing (living people)